Dhadakebaaz is a 1990 Indian Marathi-language action comedy film directed and produced by Mahesh Kothare. The film stars Laxmikant Berde in a dual role with Mahesh Kothare, Deepak Shirke, Prajakta Kulkarni, Ashwini Bhave, Ravindra Berde and Chandrakant Pandya.

Plot 
The film begins with close friends Laxmikant Hajare alias Lakshya (Laxmikant Berde), Mahesh Nemade (Mahesh Kothare) and Bappa Bajrangi (Deepak Shirke) in prison who supported themselves by committing petty crimes. After their release from prison, Mahesh and Bappa decide to cease their criminal activity and go their separate ways. Lakshya is reluctant to part with his friends as he believes that unity is strength. However, Mahesh and Bappa forge ahead and choose to live separately, leaving Lakshya alone and helpless. 

Later, Lakshya finds a five rupee coin on the street and keeps it in his jacket pocket. As his pocket has a hole, the coin drops onto the street and Lakshya picks it up again. This happens multiple times. Lakshya then walks into a restaurant and eats various dishes, believing that he has fifteen rupees. When the restaurant owner asks him to pay the bill, Lakshya realises that he does not have enough money for it. The owner throws Lakshya out of the restaurant. 

Once again, Lakshya finds the five rupee coin on the street and decides to make money with it by playing poker. In a poker game, he manages to win a few hundred rupees but it is ultimately revealed that he is cheating. The other players begin to physically assault Lakshya, but Mahesh and Bappa coincidentally arrive at the same bar and save Lakshya from them. Lakshya, Mahesh and Bappa escape from the town and vow that they will never break their friendship. 

The trio eventually reach the village of Shivapur and visit the temple of Lord Shiva where they pledge to live as law-abiding citizens. While there, Lakshya meets Ganga (Prajakta Kulkarni), a girl selling flowers outside the temple and falls in love with her. In the crowd of a protest, Lakshya's accidentally hits Ganga's uncle Constable Rede (Ravindra Berde) with a stone 
and the latter angrily arrests Lakshya. At the police station, Mahesh meets Sub-Inspector Uma Jadhav (Ashwini Bhave) and falls in love with her. 

While under police custody, Lakshya meets fellow prisoner Divtya (Bipin Varti) who treats him like a servant in prison. Soon, Divtya's accomplices attack the police station to have him released from prison. Divtya manages to escape but Lakshya captures his accomplices for the police. Impressed with his bravery, Uma releases Lakshya from prison and he reunites with Mahesh and Bappa. After the trio save Ganga from being harassed by some goons, she makes their residing arrangements in her cattle shed. 

It eventually turns out that Divtya and his accomplices are working for the sadistic Kautya Mahakaal (Chandrakant Pandya), a skull-masked crime lord who is funding crime in Shivapur and remains fugitive to the authorities. Uma has an old enmity with the latter and wants him dead or alive as he had killed her parents as well. In order to free Kautya Mahakaal's arrested henchmen, Divtya and few other henchmen try to capture Lakshya and Ganga, who manage to escape from them and end up at the ruins of an old fort. 

Inside the abandoned fort, Lakshya discovers a small bottle and that an exact lookalike of him is trapped in it. He introduces himself as Gangaram (also Laxmikant Berde), a genie and the ancestor of Lakshya. Gangaram tells Lakshya that he was learning magic from a guru thousands of years ago, but an accident occurred, and the guru cursed him by trapping him inside the bottle with a magical sand. The guru told him that he will be freed from his curse only when his descendant will use the sand given by him for his own benefit. 

Upon learning this, Lakshya agrees to help Gangaram in being freed from his curse. Gangaram saves Lakshya and Ganga from Kautya Mahakaal's henchmen and even from the reprimanding of Rede, who disapproves of their relationship. Later that day, Lakshya, Mahesh and Bappa get the job of colouring the temple of Lord Shiva but Mahesh and Bappa are stunned to learn Gangaram's existence from Lakshya. Using his magic, Gangaram colours the temple from the trio's cattle shed in five minutes. 

Soon, Kautya Mahakaal and his henchmen attack the village of Shivapur during the festival of Mahashivratri. Despite this, the trio thwart the criminals from the village with the help of Gangaram. Due to this incident, Kautya Mahakaal learns the truth of Gangaram and now decides to seize the bottle for his own betterment. That night, Divtya tries to steal the bottle of Gangaram from the trio's cattle shed but his plan backfires as Lakshya has Gangaram turn Divtya into a frog.

However, things take a drastic turn when Kautya Mahakaal retaliates by having his henchmen abduct Lakshya and Ganga with the bottle of Gangaram. Mahesh, Bappa, Uma and Rede are frantically searching for them and find one of Kautya Mahakaal's henchmen left behind in an injured state at the scene where the abduction took place. Forcing him to reveal the whereabouts of Kautya Mahakaal's hideout, Mahesh, Bappa and Uma reach there on time and free Lakshya and Ganga.

Recovering the bottle from Kautya Mahakaal, Lakshya asks Gangaram to directly kill his entire gang but Gangaram discovers that his sandbag has already emptied. As Mahesh, Bappa and Uma are captured by the henchmen, Gangaram encourages Lakshya to fight against Kautya Mahakaal himself and states that one's mental strength is the real magic in the world. Acting upon Gangaram's encouragement, Lakshya, with a strong heart,  overpowers Kautya Mahakaal and his henchmen along with Mahesh and Bappa. 

Lakshya and Mahesh further manage to knock Kautya Mahakaal unconscious and the police are called in to the scene by Rede. As a result, all of Kautya Mahakaal's henchmen are arrested and sent to prison for their crimes, while Rede also agrees for Lakshya and Ganga's marriage. As everyone rejoice in the defeat of Kautya Mahakaal, the latter shockingly regains consciousness and shoots down Lakshya fatally before escaping from his hideout. Mahesh chases Kautya Mahakaal and gets into a combat with him. 

Eventually, Kautya Mahakaal is shot dead by Uma in revenge of her parents' death. Mahesh and Uma return to the crime scene and with Ganga, Bappa and Rede, lament the tragic loss of Lakshya who miraculously survives with the blessings of Gangaram, much to everyone's happiness. Before his departure, Gangaram advises everyone to always be powerful and defeat all the evil in the world, and also to never part with each other and stay united. The film ends with everyone bidding farewell to Gangaram as he is finally freed from his curse and leaves for his heavenly abode.

Cast 
 Laxmikant Berde in a dual role as 
 Laxmikant Hajare a.k.a. Lakshya 
 Genie Gangaram
 Mahesh Kothare as Mahesh Nemade
 Deepak Shirke as Bappa Bajrangi
 Prajakta Kulkarni as Ganga
 Ashwini Bhave as Sub-Inspector Uma Jadhav
 Ravindra Berde as Constable Rede (Ganga's uncle) 
 Chandrakant Pandya as Kautya Mahakaal 
 Bipin Varti as Divtya (Kautya Mahakaal's henchman) 
 Ashok Pahelwan as Kautya Mahakaal's henchman 
 Shanta Inamdar as Parubai (Ganga's mother) 
 Ambar Kothare as Police Superintendent (Special Appearance)

Production
Dhadakebaaz is the first Marathi movie made in CinemaScope. The story was written by Mahesh Kothare. Lyrics for the songs were written by Pravin Davane. These songs are performed by Suresh Wadkar, Sudesh Bhosle, Usha Mangeshkar, Jyotsna Hardikar, Uttara Kelkar, Vinay Mandake and Anupama Deshpande.

The role of robber Kawatya Mahakal was played by eight different actors at various times during principal photography. Bipin Warti first portrayed Kawatya Mahakal, but he was unable to continue because he was shooting another film. Bipin Varti performed the voice-over for Kawatya Mahakal for the entire film by himself. Laxmikant Berde's hand was injured during filming of the gunfire shooting sequence.

Soundtrack
The lyrics were written by Anil Mohile. Songs title are:
 "Hi dosti tutaychi nay" by Suresh Wadkar, Sudesh Bhosle
"Gangaram Ye" by Sudesh Bhosle, Anupama
"Phu Bai Phu Phugadi Phu" by Vinay Mandke, Uttara Kelkar

References

External links 
 

1990s Marathi-language films
Films directed by Mahesh Kothare
Indian action films
Marathi films remade in other languages
Indian buddy films
1990s buddy films